Shahbaz Younas (Urdu: شہباز یونس, born on 2 March 1996) is a Pakistani footballer who plays as a centre-back for Pakistan Army. Younas has represented both Pakistan national football team and Pakistan U23 team simultaneously from 2015.

Club career

Pakistan Army

2014–15
Younas started his career with Pakistan Army in 2014–15 season. In his debut season, he made 10 league appearances and 6 appearances in National Cup, he made a total of 16 appearances in the debut season as Pakistan Army finished second in the league and won the third place match in the 2015 NBP National Challenge Cup.

2018–19
Younas started his 2018–19 with 2018 National Challenge Cup, as Pakistan Army lost to Pakistan Air Force on penalties in the quarter finals. Younas scored his first goal for Pakistan Army in a 2–2 draw against Pakistan Air Force, Younas scored the goal at 49th minute. Younas scored his second goal after two months, scoring the fourth goal against Baloch Nushki at 85th minute as Pakistan Army won the match 5–0. Younas ended his season with 21 league appearances and two goals, along with 3 National Cup appearances.

International
Younas made his international debut on 23 March 2015 against Yemen in 2018 FIFA World Cup qualifications. In 2018, Shahbaz made three appearances for the national side in 2018 SAFF Championship against  Bangladesh, Bhutan and India.

Career statistics

International

Honours
National Football Challenge Cup: 2019

References

External links
 
 

1996 births
Living people
People from Faisalabad
Pakistani footballers
Pakistan international footballers
Pakistan Army F.C. players
Association football defenders
Footballers from Faisalabad
Footballers from Punjab, Pakistan